Joseph Barron (died 30 July 1968) was an Irish Clann na Poblachta politician. A teacher by profession, he first stood unsuccessfully for election at the 1948 general election as a Clann na Poblachta candidate for the Dublin South-Central constituency. He was also an unsuccessful candidate at the 1951, 1954 and 1957 general elections.

He was elected to Dáil Éireann at the 1961 general election as a Clann na Poblachta Teachta Dála (TD) for the Dublin South-Central constituency.

The leader of Clann na Poblachta, Seán MacBride, lost his seat at the 1961 election, and Barron became the leader and sole member of the Clann na Poblachta parliamentary party. He lost his seat at the 1965 general election.

References

Year of birth missing
1968 deaths
Clann na Poblachta TDs
Members of the 17th Dáil
Politicians from County Dublin
Irish schoolteachers